The arrowhead dogfish (Deania profundorum) is a small little known deepwater dogfish of the family Centrophoridae.

Physical characteristics
The arrowhead dogfish has an extremely long angular snout, no anal fin, small first dorsal and long rear dorsal spines, and pitchfork-shaped dermal denticles. The first dorsal fin is short and placed high on the back. This is the smallest of the genus Deania, with a maximum length of only 76 cm.

Distribution
It is found in the Pacific Ocean around the Philippines, in the Western Atlantic Ocean off of the Carolinas, in the Eastern Atlantic all along Africa's west coast, and in the Indian Ocean off South Africa.

Habits and habitat
This shark is a little-known deepwater species that lives at depths between 300 and 1,785 m. It is ovoviviparous with five to seven pups per litter. It eats bony fish, squid, and crustaceans.

References

 
 FAO Species Catalogue Volume 4 Parts 1 and 2 Sharks of the World

arrowhead dogfish
Fish of the Atlantic Ocean
Fish of the Philippines
Fish of South Africa
Gulf of Guinea
Fauna of Socotra
Marine fauna of Southern Africa
arrowhead dogfish